Nakia Burrise is an American actress. She is best known for her role as Tanya Sloan, the Yellow Zeo Ranger and later, the first Yellow Turbo Ranger on the television series Power Rangers Zeo and Power Rangers Turbo from 1996 to 1997.

Early life
Burrise was born in San Diego, California, the daughter of Deborah and Cornell Burrise. She attended Thomas Alva Edison Senior High School in Stockton, California (1989–1992) and UCLA's School of Theater.

Career

In 1996, Burrise was cast as Tanya Sloan in Power Rangers Zeo. She later reprised her role in Power Rangers Turbo.

Between 2013 and 2015, she was recurring as Patty Pritchett in the famous serie Hart of Dixie

In 2017, she was cast in the short film The Order and had cast many Power Rangers alumni.

Since 2020, Burrise has had a recurring role on the Henry Danger spin-off Danger Force as Angela Macklin.

Filmography

Film

Television

Web productions
 No Nerds Here (2012)

Videogames
 Barbie Dreamhouse Party (2013)
 God of War: Ragnorök (2022)

References

External links
 

20th-century American actresses
21st-century American actresses
Actresses from California
African-American actresses
American podcasters
American film actresses
American television actresses
American voice actresses
Living people
UCLA Film School alumni
American women podcasters
20th-century African-American women
20th-century African-American people
21st-century African-American women
21st-century African-American people
Year of birth missing (living people)